Sarantis Mastrogiannopoulos (alternate spellings: Sarandis) (born December 3, 1997) is a Greek professional basketball player for Apollon Patras of the Greek Basket League. He is a 1.90 m (6 ft 2.7 in) tall point guard, who can also play as a shooting guard.

Professional career

Apollon Patras
Mastrogiannopoulos started his professional career with the Greek 1st division club Apollon Patras in 2013. During the 2017–18 season Mastrogiannopoulos had a breakout year with Apollon Patras. In 31 games, he averaged 12 points, 3.2 rebounds and 1.8 assists per game. Apollon didn't manage to get the promotion back to the Greek Basket League, after being defeated from Holargos at the promotion game.

Lavrio
On July 3, 2018, Mastrogiannopoulos joined Lavrio of the Greek Basket League on a two-year contract. He averaged 4.5 points, 1.5 rebounds and 1.2 assists per game during the 2019-20 season. On August 17, 2020, he renewed his contract with the Attica club.

Koroivos Amaliadas
Mastrogiannopoulos spent the 2021-2022 campaign in the Greek 2nd division with Koroivos Amaliadas. In 27 games, he averaged career-highs of 15.3 points, 4.2 rebounds, 3.1 assists and 1.7 steals per contest.

Return to Apollon
On August 13, 2022, Mastrogiannopoulos made his return to Apollon Patras after four years.

References

External links
FIBA.com profile
DraftExpress.com profile
RealGM.com profile

1997 births
Living people
Apollon Patras B.C. players
Greek Basket League players
Greek men's basketball players
Guards (basketball)
Koroivos B.C. players
Lavrio B.C. players
Basketball players from Patras